5th Indian Cavalry Brigade may refer to

 5th (Mhow) Cavalry Brigade of the British Indian Army in the First World War
 Designation held by the 4th (Secunderabad) Cavalry Brigade of the British Indian Army from September 1920 to 1923